The Men's 5,000 metres event at the 2007 Pan American Games took place on July 23, 2007 in the Estádio Olímpico João Havelange in Rio de Janeiro. USA's Ed Moran won the race, setting a new Pan Am Record.

Medalists

Records

Results

See also
2007 World Championships in Athletics – Men's 5000 metres
Athletics at the 2008 Summer Olympics – Men's 5000 metres

References
Official results

5000 metres, Men
2007